Gavin Cowan (born 24 May 1981) is an English retired footballer and manager who played as a centre-back. He recently managed AFC Telford United.

He has notably played as a professional in the Football League for Shrewsbury Town. He has also played for Braintree Town, Canvey Island, Nuneaton Borough, Kidderminster Harriers, Grays Athletic, AFC Telford United, Fleetwood Town and Gainsborough Trinity.

Career
Cowan began his career at non-League club Braintree Town and moved to Canvey Island in 2003. He fell out of favour with Canvey Island manager Jeff King and in early 2005 was sent out on loan to Nuneaton Borough.

Impressing for the Football Conference side, he was spotted by Shrewsbury Town who signed him on a permanent deal in March 2005.

Shrewsbury did not use him regularly, with Cowan playing 15 times in the 2005–06 season. Early into the 2006–07 season he was sent out on loan to Kidderminster Harriers to gain more experience. He was recalled from this loan a few days short of the agreed month, in order to give him more preparation time for Shrewsbury's next league game, for which he appeared on the bench.

Shrewsbury Town cancelled his contract on 1 January 2007, allowing him to join Grays Athletic. In March 2007, Cowan returned to Nuneaton Borough on one-month loan. Cowan was released by Grays Athletic by mutual consent on 9 June 2007.

Finally after two loan previous spells in his career, he returned to Nuneaton Borough signing a two-year contract on 17 June 2007 ready for the club's Conference North promotion campaign ahead. Cowan's contract with Nuneaton was however announced to have been cancelled by mutual consent on 30 May 2008.

After returning to Essex briefly Cowan decided Shropshire was the place for him and so returned opting to come out of full-time football signing a two-year at Nuneaton Borough while looking to pursue a career in sports development.

He studied for a sports science degree at Shrewsbury College and had taken his coaching badges. He had also been involved with the Football Association helping to coach children of all ages and abilities. Cowan then signed for AFC Telford which enabled him to combine football with studying and coaching which he is hoping will all benefit him in his desire to give something back into a game that has been so good to him.

In January 2010, Cowan signed for Conference North rivals Fleetwood Town following his release by Telford, making his debut on 7 February away at Corby. He joined Gainsborough Trinity in March 2010.

Cowan left Gainsborough after the 2011/12 season to join Nuneaton Town, the club that reformed from Cowan's former team Nuneaton Borough, after they were promoted to the Conference Premier. Coincidentally Nuneaton had been promoted by beating Cowan's Gainsborough in the playoff final the previous season (although Cowan did not play in the final due to injury).

Following Nuneatons relegation to The Conference North, Cowan is now being linked with a move to Tamworth, to join up with teammates from the Nuneaton side of 2013–14.

On 18 May 2015, Cowan signed for National League North side Solihull Moors as player/coach. He left at the end of the 2015–2016 season.

Outside football
Cowan is both founder, and head coach of his own Football Academy, coaching Children on Football, life skills and general guidance on a healthy life style.

In December 2021 Cowan, along with his ex Shrewsbury Town teammates Dave Edwards and Sam Aiston, launched the podcast, In The Stiffs.

References

External links

1981 births
Living people
English footballers
England semi-pro international footballers
Association football defenders
Braintree Town F.C. players
Canvey Island F.C. players
Nuneaton Borough F.C. players
Shrewsbury Town F.C. players
Kidderminster Harriers F.C. players
Grays Athletic F.C. players
AFC Telford United players
Fleetwood Town F.C. players
Gainsborough Trinity F.C. players
Solihull Moors F.C. players
English Football League players
National League (English football) players
English football managers
AFC Telford United managers
National League (English football) managers